Pokrovka is a rural locality (a village) in Starokalkashevsky Selsoviet, Sterlibashevsky District, Bashkortostan, Russia. The population was 20 as of 2010. There is 1 street.

Geography 
Pokrovka is located 18 km northeast of Sterlibashevo (the district's administrative centre) by road. Baimovo is the nearest rural locality.

References 

Rural localities in Sterlibashevsky District